Look East policy may refer to:

 Look East policy (Bangladesh)
 Look East policy (India)
 Look East policy (Malaysia), instituted under Prime Minister Mahathir Mohamad

See also
 Look East (disambiguation)